Pompei or Pompeii (as in the name of the ancient city) is a city and commune in the Metropolitan City of Naples, Italy, home of the ancient Roman ruins of Pompeii that are part of the UNESCO World Heritage Sites.

History

Modern Pompei was founded in 1891 after the building of the Shrine of Our Lady of Pompei by the lawyer Bartolo Longo.

Geography
The town of Pompei is located at the eastern borders of its province, and its urban area is contiguous with Scafati, in the Province of Salerno. It borders also with Torre Annunziata, Castellammare di Stabia, Boscoreale, Santa Maria la Carità and Sant'Antonio Abate.

Main attractions

The ancient city of Pompeii
Modern Pompei is mainly famous for the ruins of the ancient city of Pompeii, located in the zone of Pompei Scavi. The vast archaeological area is under Unesco patronage and attracts tourists from all around the world.

The Shrine of Our Lady of Pompei
The Shrine of Our Lady of Pompei, dedicated to Our Lady of the Rosary, has become a site for Catholic pilgrimages in recent years. It houses a canvas by Luca Giordano. It was founded by a convert who reportedly experienced a miracle from the Virgin Mary; miracles have been reported since its foundation. The ex-votos that cover the walls of the church are a testimonial of the miracles granted by the Virgin Mary since the church was consecrated in 1891. Many churches, chapels, and shrines around the world are dedicated to Our Lady of Pompei.

The bell tower
The bell tower was built between 1912 and 1925. Designed by Aristide Leonori and his brother Pio Leonori, it is 80 metres high (260 ft). The top of the bell tower, which can be reached by taking a lift, allows visitors to enjoy a splendid view of the modern city, Mount Vesuvius and part of the ancient city of Pompeii.

Sacred architecture
 Shrine of Our Lady of Pompei
 Church of San Salvatore
 Church of Sacro Cuore di Gesù
 Church of San Giuseppe sposo della Beata Vergine
 Church of Santa Maria Assunta in Cielo
 Church of Immacolata Concezione
 Church of Madonna dell'Arco
 Chapel of Madonna delle Grazie
 Church of Sacri Cuori di Gesù e Maria

Demographics

Transportation

Road
Pompei is served by the motorway A3 at the exits of Pompei-Scafati, Pompei Ovest (close to the ruins of Villa of the Mysteries) and also Castellammare di Stabia. It is crossed by the national roads SS 18 and SS 145.

Railways
On the Naples-Salerno line, owned by FS, is situated the main railway station and a little stop named Pompei Scavi (ruins of P.), closed in the 1970s. Onto two lines owned by the SFSM – Circumvesuviana, Pompei counts a total of 4 station. Pompei Santuario (P. Sanctuary, in the middle of the town) and Pompei Valle (close to Pompeii) lies on the Torre Annunziata-Pompei-Poggiomarino line. Pompei Scavi-Villa dei Misteri (serving the Villa of the Mysteries) and Moregine lie on the Naples-Torre Annunziata-Castellammare-Sorrento line.

Airports

The nearest airports are:
 Napoli-Capodichino (NAP) 28 km
 Salerno-Pontecagnano (QSR) 49 km

Football
Pompei's main football team has been the A.S.D. Città di Pompei. The team no longer exists today.

Notable people

Agostino Abbagnale (b. 1966), rower
Pino D'Angiò (b. 1952), disco artist 
Felice Evacuo (b. 1982), footballer
Bartolo Longo (1841–1926), catholic blessed
Gilda Sansone (b. 1989), fashion model
Alberto Savino (b. 1973), footballer
Giovanni Serrapica (b. 1981), footballer
Vincenzo Sicignano (b. 1974), footballer
Gaetano Vastola (b. 1978), footballer
Valentina Nappi (b. 1990), adult film actress

Twin towns

 Gyeongju, South Korea
 Latiano, Italy
 Noto, Italy
 Tarragona, Spain
 Xi'an, China

Gallery

References

External links

  Official website
Pompei Tourism Info
Official tour guides of Pompei
Photo Gallery by Leonardo Bellotti 

 
Cities and towns in Campania
Populated places established in 1891
1891 establishments in Italy